Chrétien André Waydelich (28 November 1841 in Strasbourg – 7 September 1917 in Paris) was a French croquet player and Olympic champion. He received a gold medal in Singles, two balls at the 1900 Summer Olympics in Paris beating Maurice Vignerot. He was also the bronze medalist for Singles, one ball according to the IOC database.

References

External links

1841 births
1917 deaths
French croquet players
Olympic croquet players of France
Croquet players at the 1900 Summer Olympics
Olympic gold medalists for France
Olympic bronze medalists for France
Medalists at the 1900 Summer Olympics
Sportspeople from Strasbourg